Doctors Brook  (Canadian Gaelic: Allt an Doctair) is a small community in the Canadian province of Nova Scotia, located in Antigonish County. It is on Nova Scotia Route 245. It was named for Dr. Alexander MacDonald, the first medical doctor in Antigonish County.

References

Communities in Antigonish County, Nova Scotia